Android 4 may refer to:

 Android Ice Cream Sandwich (4.0 – 4.0.4)
 Android Jelly Bean (4.1 – 4.3.1)
 Android KitKat (4.4 – 4.4.4)

4.